KHEN-LP (106.9 FM) is a low-power community radio station located in Salida, Colorado, United States.

See also
List of community radio stations in the United States
Curtis Imrie, notable on-air broadcaster at KHEN-LP

External links 
KHEN official website
 

HEN-LP
Community radio stations in the United States
HEN-LP